James Lacey Dent (born May 9, 1939) is an American professional golfer.

Dent was born in the golf mecca of Augusta, Georgia, home of the Masters Tournament, though as an African American he wouldn't have been allowed onto the Augusta National course at the time, except as a caddie. He caddied both at Augusta National and at Augusta Country Club as a youth. Dent attended Augusta's historically black Paine College.

Dent turned pro in 1966. During his regular (under 50) career he was Florida PGA Champion three times. However he is mainly notable for his success on the Senior PGA Tour (now Champions Tour), where he won 12 tournaments between 1989 and 1998.  Known for his driving ability, Dent was in 1974 the inaugural winner of the World Long Drive Championship and would go on to retain the title in 1975.

Professional wins (16)

Tournament Players Series wins (1)

Other wins (3)
1976 Florida PGA Championship
1977 Florida PGA Championship
1978 Florida PGA Championship

Senior PGA Tour wins (12)

*Note: The 1990 Kroger Senior Classic was shortened to 36 holes due to rain.

Senior PGA Tour playoff record (2–2)

See also
1970 PGA Tour Qualifying School graduates
1985 PGA Tour Qualifying School graduates
List of golfers with most Champions Tour wins

External links

American male golfers
PGA Tour golfers
PGA Tour Champions golfers
African-American golfers
Golfers from Augusta, Georgia
Paine College alumni
1939 births
Living people
21st-century African-American people
20th-century African-American sportspeople